The Rektorenkonferenz der Schweizer Universitäten (CRUS; English: Rectors' Conference of the Swiss Universities) was an organization that represented universities in Switzerland. It began in 1904 as the Schweizerische Hochschulrektorenkonferenz (SHRK), becoming in 2001 the Rektorenkonferenz der Schweizer Universitäten.

Activities
The CRUS pursued the goal of promoting the common concerns of Swiss universities. Among other things, it encouraged coordination and cooperation in teaching, research, and educational services. Involved in all matters requiring mutual understanding or common opinion in higher education, it represented Swiss universities in political, business, cultural, and public arenas. The CRUS signed the Berlin Declaration on Open Access to Knowledge in the Sciences and Humanities in January 2006.

See also
 List of universities in Switzerland
 , successor to the CRUS
 Schweizerische Universitätskonferenz (SUK; Swiss University Conference)

References

This article incorporates information from the German Wikipedia.

External links 
 Former official site: 
 Rektorenkonferenz der Schweizer Universitäten in the Archivdatenbank of the Swiss Federal Archives

Universities in Switzerland
Educational organisations based in Switzerland
College and university associations and consortia in Europe
2001 establishments in Switzerland
2014 disestablishments in Switzerland